13 Block is a French hip hop group originating from Sevran, Seine-Saint-Denis. It was formed in 2012, and is made up of the artists Stavo, Zed, Zefor and OldPee, all from the Beaudottes area in Sevran. It is inspired by American-based drill from Chicago and trap from Atlanta. They have released two albums and a number of mixtapes.

Discography

Studio albums

Mixtapes

Singles

*Did not appear in the official Belgian Ultratop 50 charts, but rather in the bubbling under Ultratip charts.

Featured in

*Did not appear in the official Belgian Ultratop 50 charts, but rather in the bubbling under Ultratip charts.

Other songs

*Did not appear in the official Belgian Ultratop 50 charts, but rather in the bubbling under Ultratip charts.

References

French hip hop groups
Rappers from Seine-Saint-Denis